Elena Lucrezia Cornaro Piscopia (5 June 1646 – 26 July 1684) or Elena Lucrezia Corner, also known in English as Helen Cornaro, was a Venetian philosopher of noble descent who in 1678 became one of the first women to receive an academic degree from a university, and the first to receive a Doctor of Philosophy degree.

Early life
Elena Cornaro Piscopia was born in the Palazzo Loredan, at Venice, Republic of Venice on 5 June 1646. She was the third child of Gianbattista Cornaro-Piscopia and his mistress Zanetta Boni. Her mother was a peasant and her parents were not married at the time of her birth. Lady Elena was therefore not technically a member of the Cornaro family by birth, as Venetian law barred illegitimate children of nobles from noble privilege, even if recognized by the noble parent. Worse for Zanetta's case, she was from an extremely poor peasant family. Zanetta had likely fled to Venice in order to escape starvation, and soon found herself the mistress of a member of one of the most powerful noble dynasties in the Republic. Gianbattista and Zanetta married officially in 1654, but their children were barred from noble privilege.

In 1664, her father was chosen to become the Procuratore di San Marco de supra, the treasurer of St. Mark's Cathedral, a coveted position among Venetian nobility. At that point, Gianbattista was second only to the Doge of Venice in terms of precedence. Because of this connection, Lady Elena was prominent in the Marriage of the Sea celebration, even though she was born illegitimate. Her father tried to arrange betrothals for her several times, but she rebuffed each man's advances. Early biographers' suggestion that she took a vow of chastity at age 11 are disputed by Francesco Ludovico Maschietto.

In 1665 she took the habit of a Benedictine oblate without, however, becoming a nun.

Education
As a young girl, Lady Elena was seen as a prodigy. By the advice from Giovanni Fabris, a priest who was a friend of the family, she began a classical education. She studied Latin and Greek under distinguished instructors, and became proficient in these languages, as well as French and Spanish, by the age of seven. Her later studies included mathematics, philosophy and theology.

Elena came to be an expert musician, mastering the harpsichord, the clavichord, the harp and the violin. Her skills were shown by the music that she composed in her lifetime. In her late teens and early twenties she became interested in physics, astronomy and linguistics. , her tutor in philosophy, and at that point the Chairman of Philosophy at the University of Padua, published a book in 1668 written in Latin and centering on geometry. The book was dedicated to a twenty-two year old Elena. After the death of her main tutor, Fabris, she became even closer to Rinaldini, who took over her studies.

Career
In 1669, she translated the Colloquy of Christ by Carthusian monk Lanspergius from Spanish into Italian. The translation was dedicated to Gian Paolo Oliva, her close friend and confessor. The volume was issued in five editions in the Republic from 1669 to 1672. She was invited to be a part of many scholarly societies when her fame spread and in 1670 she became president of the Venetian society Accademia dei Pacifici.

Upon the recommendation of Carlo Rinaldini, her tutor in philosophy, Felice Rotondi petitioned the University of Padua to grant Cornaro the laurea in theology. When Cardinal Gregorio Barbarigo, the bishop of Padua, learned that she was pursuing a degree in theology, he refused on the grounds that she was a woman. However, he did allow for her to get a degree in philosophy and after a brilliant course of study she received the laurea in Philosophy. The degree was conferred on 25 June 1678, in Padua Cathedral in the presence of the university authorities, the professors of all the faculties, the students, and most of the Venetian Senators, together with many invited guests from the Universities of Bologna, Perugia, Rome and Naples. Lady Elena spoke for an hour in Classical Latin, explaining difficult passages selected at random from the works of Aristotle: one from the Posterior Analytics and the other from the Physics. She was listened to with great attention and when she had finished, she received plaudits as Professor Rinaldini proceeded to award her the insignia of the laurea: a book of philosophy, a laurel wreath on her head, a ring on her finger, and over her shoulders an ermine mozzetta. She was proclaimed  ["teacher and doctor in philosophy"], thus becoming one of the first women to receive an academic degree from a university,.

The last seven years of her life were devoted to study and charity. She died in Padua in 1684 of tuberculosis and was buried in the church of Santa Giustina.

Legacy
A few months after Elena's conferral, Charles Patin, lecturer in medicine at Padua, applied for his daughter Gabrielle-Charlotte [Carla Gabriella] Patin to begin a degree. The university, supported by Gianbattista Cornaro-Piscopia, changed its statutes to prohibit women from graduation. The next female doctorate was granted by the University of Bologna in 1732 to Laura Bassi.

Cornaro's death was marked by memorial services in Venice, Padua, Siena and Rome. The  published two memorial volumes of tributes by members: one to mark her degree, and the other her death. Padua's Accademia dei Ricovrati also produced a volume at her death. Her statue was placed in the University of Padua, which caused a medal to be struck in her honour in 1685.

In 1895 Abbess Mathilda Pynsent of the English Benedictine Nuns in Rome had Cornaro's tomb opened, the remains placed in a new casket, and a suitable tablet inscribed to her memory. Her graduation ceremony is depicted in the Cornaro Window, installed in 1906 in the West Wing of the Thompson Memorial Library at Vassar College. At the suggestion of Ruth Crawford Mitchell, Cornaro is depicted in Giovanni Romagnoli's 1949 mural in the Italian Nationality Room at the University of Pittsburgh. On 5 June 2019, Google celebrated her 373rd birthday with a Google Doodle.

Earlier biographies of Elena Cornaro include Massimiliano Dezza's Vita di Helena Lucretia Cornara Piscopia (Venice: Bosio, 1686) and Antonio Lupis' L'eroina veneta (Venice: Curti, 1689). Her collected works, with a biography, were published four years after her death by Benedetto Bacchini. Her most recent English language biography is The Lady Cornaro: Pride and Prodigy of Venice by Jane H. Guernsey (College Avenue Press, 1999).

Bibliography

Works
Her writings include academic discourses, translations and devotional treatises.

Collected
 
Previously published
  (reprinted in Bacchini ed. 1688 pp. 179–183)
Unpublished
 A 1672 discourse on Our Lady of Sorrows

Biographies
 
 Benedetto Bacchini (1688) Actorem Helenæ (in Latin; Bacchini ed. 1688 pp. 1–48)

Notes

References

Citations

Sources
 
 
 Vassar College Library Website

External links

 
 "Elena Lucrezia Cornaro Piscopia", Biographies of Women Mathematicians, Agnes Scott College
 Project Continua: Biography of Elena Lucrezia Cornaro

1646 births
1684 deaths
17th-century deaths from tuberculosis
Women mathematicians
Christian Hebraists
University of Padua alumni
17th-century Venetian writers
Benedictine oblates
Italian philosophers
17th-century philosophers
Italian scholars of ancient Greek philosophy
Italian women philosophers
17th-century Italian mathematicians
17th-century Italian women
17th-century women scientists
Elena
Tuberculosis deaths in Italy
Infectious disease deaths in Veneto